Helen Grace Culverwell Marsh-Lambert or HGC Marsh-Lambert (1888 – 1981) was a British writer and illustrator of children's books and postcards.

Life
Marsh-Lambert was born in Bristol in 1881. In 1911 she was living with her parents and she was already a successful illustrator. She was known as "Gracie". She married a banker named Charles T. Lambert in 1913.

She died in 1981.

Works
 My Big Bedtime book
 Jack and Jill's Bedtime Story Book
Story of Little Blackie
The story of Teddy Bear

References

1880s births
1981 deaths
Writers from Bristol
British women illustrators
20th-century English women writers